This is a list of schools in Fengtai District, Beijing.

Secondary schools
Note: In China the word 中学 zhōngxué, literally translated as "middle school", refers to any secondary school and differs from the American usage of the term "middle school" to mean specifically a lower secondary school or junior high school. 初中 chū​zhōng is used to refer to a lower secondary school.

 Beijing City Dacheng School (北京市大成学校)
 Beijing City Xiluoyuan School (北京市西罗园学校)
 Beijing City Youanmenwai Foreign Language School (北京市右安门外国语学校)
 Beijing No. 4 High School Puti School (北京四中璞瑅学校)
 Beijing No. 10 High School (北京市第十中学) - Main campus and East Campus (东校区)
  - Main Campus, Beijing South Railway Station Campus (南站校区), and Zhongkefeng Campus (中科丰校区)
 Beijing No. 18 High School (北京市第十八中学) - Main Campus, and Ximajinrun Campus (西马金润校区)
 Beijing City Capital Normal University Affiliated Lize High School (北京市首都师范大学附属丽泽中学) - Main Campus, and South Campus (南校区)
 Beijing City Fangxing High School (北京市芳星园中学)
 Beijing City Hangtian High School (北京市航天中学)
 Beijing City Tonglin High School (北京市佟麟阁中学)
 Beijing City Zhaodengyu School (北京市赵登禹学校) - Headquarters (本部)
 Beijing Education Science Research Institute Fengtai School (北京教育科学研究院丰台学校)
 Beijing Education Science Research Institute Fengtai Institute Affiliated School (北京教育学院丰台分院附属学校 )
 Beijing Institute of Education Affiliated Fengtai Experimental School (北京教育学院附属丰台实验学校) - Main School, and Branch School (分校)
 Beijing City Fengtai District Heyi School (北京市丰台区和义学校)
 Beijing City Fengtai District Huaishuling School (北京市丰台区槐树岭学校)
 Beijing City Fengtai District Zhangxindian School (北京市丰台区长辛店学校)
 Beijing City Fengtai District No. 2 High School (北京市丰台区丰台第二中学) - Main Campus, and Junior High School Division (初中部) 
 Beijing City Fengtai No. 8 High School (北京市丰台第八中学) - Beidadi Campus (北大地校区), Zhonghai Campus (中海校区), and Zuoanmen Branch School (左安门分校)
 Beijing City Fengtai District Huangtugang High School  (北京市丰台区黄土岗中学)
 Beijing City Fengtai District Kandan High School (北京市丰台区看丹中学)
 Beijing City Fengtai District Lugouqiao (Marco Polo Bridge) High School (北京市丰台区卢沟桥中学)
 Beijing City Fengtai District Nanyuan High School (北京市丰台区南苑中学)
 Beijing City Fengtai District Tiejiangying No. 1 High School  (北京市丰台区东铁匠营第一中学)
 Beijing City Fengtai District Tiejiangying No. 2 High School (北京市丰台区东铁匠营第二中学)
 Beijing City Fengtai District Zhangxindian No. 1 High School (北京市丰台区长辛店第一中学)
 Beijing City Fengtai District Part-time High School (北京市丰台区工读学校)
 Beijing Normal University No. 4 Affiliated High School (北京师范大学第四附属中学) - Junior High School (初中) and Senior High School (高中)
 Capital Normal University Affiliated Yungang High School (首都师范大学附属云岗中学)
 Capital University of Economics and Business Affiliated High School (首都经济贸易大学附属中学)
 China Education Science Research Institute Fengtai Experimental School (中国教育科学研究院丰台实验学校)
 High School Affiliated to Minzu University of China Fengtai Experimental School (丰台实验学校)
 High School Affiliated to Renmin University of China Fengtai School (丰台学校)
 Tsinghua University High School Fengtai School (丰台学校) - Secondary School Division (中学部)

Primary schools

 China Education Science Research Institute Fengtai Experimental School (中国教育科学研究院丰台实验学校) - Primary Division One (小学一部) and Primary Division Two (小学二部)
 Tsinghua University High School Fengtai School (丰台学校) - Primary School Division (小学部)

References

Fengtai
Schools